Winton East is a ward in Bournemouth, Dorset. Since 2019, the ward has elected 2 councillors to Bournemouth, Christchurch and Poole Council.

History 
The ward formerly elected councillors to Bournemouth Borough Council before it was abolished in 2019.

Geography 
The Winton East ward is in Bournemouth, centred on the eastern areas of Winton and the western areas of Charminster.

Councillors 
Two Green councillors.

Election results

2019 Bournemouth, Christchurch and Poole Council election

References 

Wards of Bournemouth, Christchurch and Poole